In heraldry, cendrée  is a tincture, the grey of ashes (French cendres), iron, and stone walls.

It is rare in Anglophone heraldry, but common in Germany, and to a lesser extent in France.

A rare British example is the arms of Uplawmoor Primary School (Public Register vol 81, p 62): Tierced per pale: first, cendree and second gules over all a bell tower per pale argent and cendree, the bell counterchanged; third per pale argent and cendree, a square tower counterchanged; a base tierced per pale, first gules, second argent a book expanded cendree, third per bend gules and cendree three edock leaves conjoined at the stalk in triangle, one in bend, and two in bend sinister argent.

Colours (heraldry)
Shades of gray